Zale horrida, the horrid zale, is a species of moth in the family Erebidae. The species was first described by Jacob Hübner in 1819. It is found in North America.

The MONA or Hodges number for Zale horrida is 8717.

References

Further reading

External links

 

Omopterini
Articles created by Qbugbot
Moths described in 1819